Fur (stylised as FUR) are an English indie rock band based in Brighton, England. The band was formed by lead singer and guitarist Will Murray, former guitarist Harry Saunders, bassist Will Tavener, and drummer Flynn Whelan. The members met when they attended BIMM Institute in 2015. Saunders left the band in 2019. He was then replaced by guitarist and keyboard player Josh Buchanan, who shares the writing duties with Murray. They are currently signed to Boy Pablo's independent label, 777 MUSIC.

The band is known for their unique mixture of the 50s and 60s-inspired style with current modern sound. Their 2017 hit single "If You Know that I'm Lonely" has garnered million views on YouTube, gaining significant portions mostly from Southeast Asia and South America, especially Indonesia, Peru, and Brazil. In November 2021, they released their debut album and their first ever release under 777 MUSIC, When You Walk Away. The album was met with positive reviews, highlighting on the band's craftsmanship in fusing contemporary and traditional rock as well as touching relevant subject to their listeners which the band described as "the individual's post-coming-of-age era."

Members

Current 
Will Murray - vocals, guitar (2015–present)
Will "Tav" Tavener - bass, backing vocals (2015–present)
Flynn Whelan - drums (2015–present)
Josh Buchanan - guitar, keyboards, backing vocals (2019–present)

Former 
 Harry "Zwaig" Saunders - guitar, backing vocals (2015–2019)

Discography

Studio albums

Mixtapes

EPs

References

External links
 Fur on Instagram
 777 MUSIC website

English indie rock groups
Musical groups from Brighton and Hove
 Musical groups established in 2015
 2015 establishments in England
Musical quartets